A Westerner is a person from the Western world.

The Westerner or Westerner may also refer to:

In arts and entertainment:
 The Westerners (1919 film), a 1919 American film directed by Edward Sloman
 The Westerner (1934 film), a 1934 American western starring Tim McCoy
 The Westerner (1940 film), a 1940 American western starring Gary Cooper and Walter Brennan
 The Westerner (TV series), a 1960 show created by Sam Peckinpah
 Westerner Gambling House and Saloon, a former Las Vegas casino owned by Benny Binion
 Westerner, a short-lived comic book (three issues) put out by I. W. Publications
 The Westerner (video game), a 2004 PC game published by Focus Home Interactive

Other uses:
 The Westerner, successor to The West Coast Miner newspaper in Tasmania
 Westerner, a limited-edition, luxury version of the AMC Rebel station wagon
 Westerner (horse) (born 1999), 2005 winner of the Ascot Gold Cup horse race
 Westerner (Missouri Pacific train), a train operated by the Missouri Pacific Railroad between St. Louis and Kansas City, Missouri
 Westerner (Nickel Plate train), a train operated by the New York, Chicago and St. Louis Railroad between Buffalo and Chicago
 Westerner (Texas & Pacific train), a train operated by the Texas and Pacific Railway between St. Louis and El Paso
 , a United States Navy cargo ship in commission from 1918 to 1919

See also
 The Western, a defunct hotel in Las Vegas, Nevada
 Westernizer, a pro-Western 19th century Russian intellectual